Maurice Durquetty was a French pelotari who competed at the 1900 Summer Olympics in Paris, France.

Durquetty competed in the only official pelota contest in Olympic history, the Basque pelota at the 1900 Summer Olympics two-man teams event.  He and his partner Etchegaray lost to the Spanish team, Francisco Villota and José de Amézola y Aspizúa.

References
 De Wael, Herman. Herman's Full Olympians: "Pelota 1900". Accessed 25 February 2006.

External links

Pelotaris at the 1900 Summer Olympics
Olympic pelotaris of France
Place of death missing
French pelotaris
Year of birth missing
Year of death missing
Place of birth missing